Maurice Montague "Molly" Craft (November 28, 1895 – October 25, 1978) was a pitcher in Major League Baseball. He played for the Washington Senators.

References

External links

1895 births
1978 deaths
Major League Baseball pitchers
Washington Senators (1901–1960) players
Baseball players from Virginia
Sportspeople from Portsmouth, Virginia
Norfolk Tars players
Minneapolis Millers (baseball) players
Toronto Maple Leafs (International League) players
Shreveport Gassers players
Reading Aces players
New Orleans Pelicans (baseball) players
Portsmouth Truckers players
Memphis Chickasaws players